Sannyasa Upanishad or Samnyasa Upanishad may refer to:

A group of Hindu texts called the Sannyasa Upanishads
Brihat-Sannyasa Upanishad: A 14th- or 15th-century CE text on renunciation
Laghu-Sannyasa Upanishad: An ancient, pre 3rd-century CE text on renunciation, which is also called Kundika Upanishad